Tonino Cervi (4 June 1929 – 1 April 2002) was an Italian film director, screenwriter and producer.

Background
Born in Rome, Cervi was the son of actor Gino Cervi and father of Antonia Cervi, Antonio Levesi Cervi, Stefano Cervi and actress Valentina Cervi.  He made his debut as a film producer in 1952, with La Peccatrice dell'isola by Sergio Corbucci; among others, he produced works of Michelangelo Antonioni, Federico Fellini, Bernardo Bertolucci, Mauro Bolognini, Francesco Rosi, Mario Monicelli.

Cervi made his directional debut with the spaghetti Western Oggi a me... domani a te starring Bud Spencer; among his films two box office hits both starring Alberto Sordi, The Miser and Il malato immaginario. He also directed the film Ritratto di borghesia in nero.

Cervi died in Rome of a heart attack.

References

External links 
 

1929 births
2002 deaths
Italian film directors
20th-century Italian screenwriters
Spaghetti Western directors
Italian film producers
Film people from Rome
Italian male screenwriters
Burials at the Cimitero Flaminio
20th-century Italian male writers